Saint-Gibrien is a commune in the Marne department in north-eastern France.

See also
 Communes of the Marne department
 Gibrian, eponymous saint of Saint-Gibrien

References

Saintgibrien